Scopula episticta is a moth of the  family Geometridae found in northern Australia.

References

Moths described in 1942
episticta
Moths of Australia